Paweł Sokół (born 2 March 2000) is a Polish professional footballer who plays as a goalkeeper for Górnik Zabrze.

Club career

He played for the Manchester City youth academy.

On 7 August 2020 he joined Chojniczanka Chojnice on a one-year contract.

References

External links

2000 births
People from Dębica
Sportspeople from Podkarpackie Voivodeship
Living people
Polish footballers
Poland youth international footballers
Association football goalkeepers
Korona Kielce players
Elana Toruń players
Chojniczanka Chojnice players
Górnik Zabrze players
Ekstraklasa players
II liga players
III liga players
Polish expatriate footballers
Expatriate footballers in England
Polish expatriate sportspeople in England